The Golden Melody Award for Album of the Year is presented by the Ministry of Culture of Taiwan to honor quality vocal or instrumental recording albums in the pop music genre. The honor was first presented in the 2nd Golden Melody Awards. The award was discontinued in 2005 and was separated into Best Mandarin Album, Best Taiwanese Album, Best Hakka Album, and Best Aboriginal Album. In 2017, the award was revived and albums in different languages are eligible for this award. Particular awards for Best Mandarin Album, Best Taiwanese Album, Best Hakka Album, and Best Aboriginal Album remained.

Recipients

Category facts 
Most wins

Most nominations

References 

Golden Melody Awards
Album awards